Westmoreland County Community College is a public community college in Youngwood, Pennsylvania. It was founded in 1970 during an era of community college proliferation within the state. Its location on the suburban fringe was designed to attract students from both the Westmoreland County suburbs of Pittsburgh and the Monongahela Valley, then a still booming industrial center. The college has also extended its outreach to provide services to students from Fayette and Indiana Counties.

History
Westmoreland County Community College, founded in 1970, first offered evening classes at Jeannette High School in 1971. By the fall of 1972, the college took up a permanent residence in a former Westinghouse plant in Youngwood and expanded its schedule to include day classes.

In the four decades since, Westmoreland's original campus in Youngood has expanded to four buildings. The college has opened additional centers in other areas: the Murrysville Education Center in Export, Fayette County Education Center in Uniontown,  Indiana County Center in Indiana, Latrobe Education Center, New Kensington Education Center and Public Safety Training Center in Smithton.

Westmoreland currently offers 64 associate degree programs, 13 diploma options and 49 certificate programs to prepare students for careers or transfer to baccalaureate degree programs at a four-year institution. The college also offers Continuing Education courses for adults, displaced workers, non-traditional students and even college for kids.

The college hosts several athletics teams, nicknamed the Wolfpack, including baseball, basketball, bowling, softball, and volleyball. In Fall 2020, the women's cross country team was ranked number two in the nation by the U.S. Track & Field and Cross Country Coaches Association. In Fall 2023, the athletics program will transition to Division II in the NCJAA and begin to offer scholarships to student athletes.

Campus

Starting with a single building, Westmoreland County Community College now comprises four buildings on its main campus in Youngwood, Pennsylvania.

Student Achievement Center
Westmoreland's original building, formerly known as Founders Hall, houses academic and administrative offices, classrooms, the library, a 300-seat amphitheater and a tutoring and learning center. It also contains the college store, student center, cafeteria and a licensed day care center. A gymnasium, indoor running track and a combination aerobic/fitness center provide fitness options for students and faculty.

Health and Culinary Center
The Health and Culinary Center, previously known as Commissioners Hall until 2020, houses additional academic and administrative offices, classrooms, laboratories, a culinary arts complex and a dining facility.

Science Innovation Center
Science Innovation Center consists of classrooms and laboratories, a dental hygiene clinic and an art gallery. The facility also contains a 420-seat theater.

Business and Industry Center
The Business and Industry Center contains administrative offices and classrooms. It also holds offices for PA CareerLink-Westmoreland and the Workforce Investment Board.

Athletic facilities
Constructed in 1992, the baseball field, softball field and multipurpose field are used for intercollegiate competitions, intramural sporting activities and noncredit programming.

Academic centers
Westmoreland County Community College maintains education centers that serve all of Westmoreland, Fayette and Indiana counties. Each center offers day and evening classes as well as online courses. Student services such as counseling, advising and financial aid are available at scheduled times.

Murrysville Education Center
Located in Export, this center houses traditional classrooms, a distance learning classroom, computer and science laboratories, workforce development training and a student lounge.

Latrobe Education Center
This center contains traditional classrooms, distance learning classroom, computer classrooms/labs, electronic classrooms, a natural science classroom/lab and student lounge areas.

New Kensington Education Center
Founded in 2009, this center is located in downtown New Kensington.  It contains traditional classrooms, a distance learning classroom, computer classrooms/labs, a science lab and a student lounge. The New Kensington Education Center is also home to PA CareerLink - Alle-Kiski, which provides services to the unemployed.

Public Safety Training Center
Completed in 2003 with an addition in 2018, this training center is located in South Huntington Township. Designed for firefighter, police and emergency services personnel, it features a class A live burn building, outdoor firing range, rubble pile and a classroom/administration building.

Fayette County Education Center
Housed in the Fayette County Community Action Agency Inc. Campus in Uniontown, this center features traditional classrooms, a computer classroom, a videoconferencing classroom and administrative offices.

Indiana County Center
Located in Indiana near the Jimmy Stewart Airport, the center contains a computer lab, nursing lab, six classrooms, an office and a student lounge. A new building housing the Indiana County Center is scheduled to open in Fall 2022.

Advanced Technology Center
Located in New Stanton in the former Sony Technology Center. The Advanced Technology Center offers training for students and incumbent workers in: applied industrial technology, mechatronics, energy technologies, design technologies, machining and fabrication, additive manufacturing, welding, and STEM.

Notable alumni
 Herman Mihalich, former Democratic member of the Pennsylvania House of Representatives
 Richard Rosendale, chef

References

External links

 Official website

Two-year colleges in the United States
Community colleges in Pennsylvania
Educational institutions established in 1970
Universities and colleges in Westmoreland County, Pennsylvania
1970 establishments in Pennsylvania
NJCAA athletics